The Sonatina in G major is a composition for solo piano attributed to Ludwig van Beethoven (listed as Anh. 5 No. 1 in the Kinsky–Halm Catalogue). The work was published in Hamburg, Germany, after Beethoven's death; its authenticity is doubtful, as it uses styles never seen by Beethoven before.

Structure

The composition is in two movements:

 Moderato
 Romance

The first movement is in  time; the second movement is titled Romance and is in  time.

External links 
  
 Video of Sonatina in G major Anh.5 with sheet music.

Piano solos by Ludwig van Beethoven
Beethoven
Compositions in G major
Beethoven: spurious and doubtful works